Melaleuca densispicata is a plant in the myrtle family Myrtaceae and is native to Queensland and New South Wales in Australia. It is a dense, woody shrub or tree with papery or scaly bark, sharp pointed leaves and dense flower spikes. It is uncommon throughout its range and was not formally described until 1984.

Description

Each spike contains between 5 and 24 flowers, each flower with five bundles of stamens, each bundle with 8 to 15 stamens. Flowering mainly occurs from September to December but also from February to May.

Taxonomy and naming
Melaleuca densispicata was first formally described by Byrnes in 1984 in Austrobaileya. The specific epithet (densispicata) is from the Latin densus (dense) and spica (spike) referring to the flowers being close together in the inflorescence".

Distribution and habitat
Melaleuca densispicata occurs in disjunct populations on the western Darling Downs in Queensland and on the North West Slopes, North West Plains and Far North West Plains in New South Wales. It grows on plains in low-lying areas and along stream channels in heavy clay soils.

References

densispicata
Myrtales of Australia
Flora of New South Wales
Flora of Queensland
Plants described in 1984
Taxa named by Norman Brice Byrnes